Montfoort is a municipality and a city in the Netherlands, in the province of Utrecht. Montfoort received city rights in 1329.

Population centres 
The municipality of Montfoort consists of the following cities, towns, villages and/or districts:

Topography

Dutch topographic map of the municipality of Montfoort, June 2015

Notable people 
 Jan III van Montfoort (ca.1448 – 1522) a leader of the Hook Party in the Bishopric of Utrecht
 Anthonie Blocklandt van Montfoort (1533 or 1534 - 1583) a Dutch painter
 Isbrand van Diemerbroeck (1609–1674) a Dutch physician, anatomist and professor
 Matthew Maty (1718–1776) a physician and writer, secretary of the Royal Society and librarian of the British Museum 
 Mark van Eldik (born 1967) a Dutch rally driver

Gallery

See also
Memorial tablet for the lords of Montfoort

References

External links 
 
 Official website

 
Municipalities of Utrecht (province)
Populated places in Utrecht (province)
Cities in the Netherlands